Panayiotis Demetriou (born May 6, 1939) is a Cypriot politician and Member of the European Parliament for the European People's Party. He is a member of the Democratic Rally.

References

1939 births
Living people
Democratic Rally MEPs
MEPs for Cyprus 2004–2009
Place of birth missing (living people)